Fuller Street Pond is a  pond in Carver and Middleborough, Massachusetts. The pond gets its name from the name of the street along the pond's northern shore on the Carver side. The street name on the Middleborough side is Stone Street. The water quality is impaired due to non-native aquatic plants and non-native fish.

External links
Environmental Protection Agency

Ponds of Plymouth County, Massachusetts
Ponds of Massachusetts